The 1947–48 Rugby Football League season was the 53rd season of rugby league football.

Season summary
Warrington won their first Championship when they beat Bradford Northern 15–5 in the play-off final. Wigan had ended the regular season as the league leaders.

The Challenge Cup Winners were Wigan who beat Bradford Northern 8–3 in the final.

Wigan's 1948 Challenge Cup Final victory over Bradford Northern was the first ever televised Rugby League match and Cup Final – although it was shown in the Midlands only.

Warrington won the Lancashire League, and Bradford Northern won the Yorkshire League. Wigan beat Belle Vue Rangers 10–7 to win the Lancashire County Cup, and Wakefield Trinity beat Leeds 7–7 (replay 8–7) to win the Yorkshire County Cup.

Championship

Play-offs

Challenge Cup

Wigan beat Bradford 8–3 in the final played at Wembley in front of a crowd of 91,465. This was the first Rugby League match ever attended by the reigning monarch, HM King George VI, who presented the trophy. This was also the first televised rugby league match.

This was Wigan's third Cup Final win in seven Final appearances including one loss during World War II. Frank Whitcombe, Bradford Northern's prop forward was awarded the Lance Todd Trophy for man-of-the-match.

References

Sources
1947-48 Rugby Football League season at wigan.rlfans.com
The Challenge Cup at The Rugby Football League website

1947 in English rugby league
1948 in English rugby league
Northern Rugby Football League seasons